Parallel Problem Solving from Nature, or PPSN, is a research conference focusing on the topic of natural computing.

Other conferences in the area include the ACM Genetic and Evolutionary Computation Conference (GECCO), the IEEE Congress on Evolutionary Computation (CEC) and EvoStar (Evo*).

In 2020 PPSN got a CORE rank of A, corresponding to an "excellent conference, and highly respected in a discipline area".

History
The idea behind PPSN emerged around 1989-1990 when Bernard Manderick, Reinhard Männer, Heinz Mühlenbein, and Hans-Paul Schwefel, realised they shared a common field of study that was not covered by the conferences on Operations Research, Physics, or Computer Science they attended regularly.

The field of Genetic Algorithms had already been established in the form of the ICGA conference in 1985, but the "fathers" of PPSN wanted a wider focus, with algorithms that included problem solving, parallel computing  and the use of natural metaphors (such as Darwinian evolution or Boltzmann dynamics).

The success of the first PPSN event at Dortmund encouraged its organisers to start a biennial conference series, as a European counterpart to the American-based ICGA (which in 1999 merged with the Genetic Programming conference to give rise to GECCO).

Analogies to natural processes included the thermodynamic process of annealing, immune systems and neural networks, as well as other paradigms, with Darwinian evolution being by far the most frequently used metaphor.

In this way, evolutionary algorithms and evolutionary computation became the common denominator for the PPSN approach to problem solving by mimicking evolutionary principles like population, birth and death, mutation, recombination, and natural selection.

Editions
So far, seventeen PPSN conferences have been held:
Dortmund (October 1–3, 1990), Brussels (September 28–30, 1992), Jerusalem (October 9–14, 1994), Berlin (September 22–26, 1996), Amsterdam (September 27–30, 1998), Paris (September 16–20, 2000), Granada (September 7–11, 2002), Birmingham (September 18–22, 2004), Reykjavik (September 9–13, 2006), Dortmund (September 13–17, 2008), Krakow (September 11–15, 2010), Taormina (Sicily) (September 1–5, 2012), Ljubljana (September 13–17, 2014), Edinburgh (September 17–21, 2016), Coimbra (September 8–12, 2018) Leiden (September 5–9, 2020), and Dortmund (September 10-14, 2022).

The last-but-one edition, held in Leiden, counted on Thomas Bäck and Mike Preuss as General Chairs and Carola Doerr, Michael Emmerich and Heike Trautmann as Programme Committee Chairs. André Deutz and Hao Wang were Proceedings Chairs and Anna Esparcia-Alcázar, Ofer Shir and Vanessa Volz were Workshops, Tutorials and Competitions Chairs, respectively; Anna Kononova was Local Chair.

Proceedings
Proceedings of PPSN have been historically published by Springer in the Lecture Notes in Computer Science (LNCS) series (except in the second edition in 1992).

 2020: LNCS 12269, LNCS 2070
 2018: LNCS 11101, LNCS 11102
 2016: LNCS 9921
 2014: LNCS 8672
 2012: LNCS 7491, LNCS 7492
 2010: LNCS 6238, LNCS 6239
 2008: LNCS 5199
 2006: LNCS 4193
 2004: LNCS 3242
 2002: LNCS 2439
 2000: LNCS 1917
 1998: LNCS 1498
 1996: LNCS 1141
 1994: LNCS 866
 1992: PPSN II
 1990: LNCS 496

External links 
  PPSN XVI in Leiden, 2020
  PPSN XV in Coimbra, 2018
  PPSN XIV in Edinburgh, 2016
  PPSN XIII in Ljubljana, Slovenia, 2014
  PPSN XII in Taormina, Sicily, 2012
  PPSN XI in Krakow, 2010
  PPSN X in Dortmund, 2008
  PPSN VIII in Birmingham, 2004

Keynote speakers

References 

Science conferences